Ilah Marian Kibbey (1883-1957) was an American genre and landscape painter. Her series Airplane Impressions consisted of paintings of views from various flights she took over the Midwest.

Life 

Ilah Marian Kibbey was born in Geneva, Ohio. She attended the New York School of Fine and Applied Art, the Kansas City Art Institute, and the Art Institute of Chicago. Alongside her art career, she worked as a teacher for the Kansas City Public Schools and as a registrar at the Kansas City Art Institute.

Kibbey's works are housed in the collections of the Smithsonian American Art Museum, the Library of Congress, the Nelson-Atkins Museum of Art and the Kansas City Museum.

Kibbey died on August 10, 1958, in Kansas City, MO.

References

External links 
 Ilah Marian Kibbey: Artist File. Spencer Art Reference Library, The Nelson-Atkins Museum of Art, Kansas City, Missouri.
 Artists clippings file available at Jannes Library, Kansas City Art Institute, Kansas City, Missouri.
Missouri Remembers Artists Portal

1883 births
1957 deaths
People from Geneva, Ohio
American painters
American women painters